North Kitsap Herald is a newspaper based in the city of Poulsbo in the U.S. state of Washington. It publishes in print every Friday. Its website merged with other Sound Publishing newspaper websites in Kitsap County in 2017 to form Kitsap Daily News.  

The North Kitsap Herald is owned by Sound Publishing Inc., a subsidiary of Black Press. 

The newspaper was founded in 1901 by Peter Iverson  as the Kitsap County Herald. The name was changed to North Kitsap Herald in 1995. 

According to Sound Publishing, the North Kitsap Herald won 20 awards from the Washington Newspaper Publishers Association and Local Media Association, of which eight were first place awards, in 2020.  

In March 2020, during the onset of the COVID-19 pandemic, the North Kitsap Herald issued a statement that it would halt Friday print editions of the publication for an unknown amount of time, and directed audiences to read the digital newspaper Kitsap Daily News, which is owned by Kitsap News Group, a division of Sound Publishing .

The Averills 
In 1962, the Kitsap County Herald, then owned by a former editor of the Albany Democrat-Herald, was purchased by David and Vera Averill. The Averills also purchased the Bainbridge Island Review from Walter and Milly Woodward. The couple successfully operated the Bainbridge Island Review and Kitsap County Herald while raising their four children. Walter Woodward remained as editor of the Review. 

Verda Averill sold the Herald, the Review, and the Kitsap Advertiser to Black Press in 1988. At the time, Black Press owned seven U.S. papers and 24 Canadian papers.

Sound Publishing 
Founded in 1987, Sound Publishing Inc. is a subsidiary of Black Press. Sound Publishing's philosophy is "digital first." The company claims to be "the largest community news organization in Washington State," serving more than 100 Washington communities, with 2.3 million digital readers and circulating in print to 661,072 readers. Sound Publishing's largest newspaper in the region is The Daily Herald in Everett.  

The company's history began in 1987 with its acquisition of the Whidbey Press Newspaper Group from Anacortes newspaper publisher Wallie Valentine Funk. The group comprised the Whidbey News-Times, founded in 1890; the South Whidbey Record and Whidbey Crosswind at Naval Air Station Whidbey. 

Whidbey Press relocated to Kitsap County in 1988 after acquiring the Port Orchard Independent. The organization went on to acquire the Bainbridge Island Review, the Central Kitsap Reporter and the North Kitsap Herald as well. In 1994, the organization renamed itself Sound Publishing.

References 

Newspapers published in Washington (state)
Kitsap County, Washington